The Amherst was a Canadian automobile manufactured in Amherstburg in 1911. The unusual feature of the car was a demountable body that could be fitted behind the front seats to convert the car into a light truck.

The car was financed by backers in Detroit, but they withdrew their support before production commenced. Only three cars were built before the company failed.

References

Brass Era vehicles
Defunct motor vehicle manufacturers of Canada